Dajuan or DaJuan is a given name. Notable people with the name include:

DaJuan Coleman (born 1992), American basketball player 
DaJuan Morgan (born 1985), American football player
DaJuan Summers (born 1988), American basketball player
Dajuan Wagner (born 1983), American basketball player